Algeria competed at the 2004 Summer Paralympics in Athens, Greece. The team included eighteen athletes, fourteen men and four women. Algeria won thirteen medals, six gold, two silver and five bronze.

Team
Algeria had an 18-member large delegation in Athens, including 14 men and 4 women. Three members of the delegation, including two athletes, participated in a study about dental health during the Games.

Medallists
Algeria won thirteen medals, six gold, two silver and five bronze.
| width=75% align=left valign=top |

| width=25% align=left valign=top |

Results by event

Athletics

Men–track

Men–field

Women–field

Judo

Men

Powerlifting

Women

See also
Algeria at the Paralympics
Algeria at the 2004 Summer Olympics

References 

Nations at the 2004 Summer Paralympics
2004
Summer Paralympics